The Nicolae Bălcescu Land Forces Military Academy is an institute of higher military education located in Sibiu, Romania.

The institution was established July 1, 1920, at the initiative of Minister of War Ioan Rășcanu, through Decree 5376/1920 signed by King Ferdinand I of Romania. It is named after Nicolae Bălcescu,  a Romanian Wallachian soldier and leader of the 1848 Wallachian Revolution.

References

External links 

 Official site

Education in Sibiu
Military academies of Romania
1920 establishments in Romania
Educational institutions established in 1920
Greater Romania